The Government Identity System is maintained by His Majesty's Government to present unified branding format for the logos of government ministries, agencies and arms length bodies. The format was introduced in 2012 alongside a revamp of gov.uk to provide a clearer brand for all government work.

The consistent element of the Government identity is the Royal Coat of Arms, with the text name of the organisation below it, and a vertical line of colour to the left.

Exemptions to the use of the Royal Coat of Arms may be permitted when an organisation has its own arms, insignia, or symbol. These include:
HM Coast Guard
HM Revenue & Customs
Home Office and associated agencies
Department for International Trade
Government Communications Headquarters
Ministry of Defence and associated agencies
Scotland Office
Secret Intelligence Service
Security Service
UK Hydrographic Office
UK Atomic Energy Authority
Wales Office

References 

Identity management
Identity management systems